Boletellus singeri is a species of fungus in the family Boletaceae. It is known from Mexico, where it was collected from Sierra Nanchititla in the municipality of Tejupilco. The species is named after American mycologist Rolf Singer.

References

External links

Fungi of Mexico
singerii
Fungi described in 1995
Fungi without expected TNC conservation status